Arrhenia chlorocyanea, commonly known as the verdigris navel, is a species of agaric fungus in the family Hygrophoraceae. Originally named as a species of Agaricus in 1885, and later classified as a member of Omphalina, the species was transferred to the genus Arrhenia in 2002. It is found in Europe and North America.

References

External links

Fungi described in 1885
Fungi of Europe
Fungi of North America
Hygrophoraceae